Sakhrai is a district (amphoe) of Nong Khai province, northeastern Thailand.

History
The minor district (king amphoe) was split off from Mueang Nong Khai district on 30 April 1994.

On 15 May 2007, all 81 minor districts were upgraded to full districts. Publication in the Royal Gazette on 24 August the upgrade became official.

Geography
Neighboring districts are (from the north clockwise): Tha Bo and Mueang Nong Khai of Nong Khai Province, and Phen and Ban Phue of Udon Thani province.

Administration
The district is divided into three sub-districts (tambons), which are further subdivided into 39 villages (mubans). There are no municipal (thesaban) areas. There are three tambon administrative organizations (TAO).

Gallery

References

External links
amphoe.com

Sa Khrai